Papyrus 21 (in the Gregory-Aland numbering), designated by siglum 𝔓21, is an early copy of the New Testament in Greek. It is a papyrus manuscript of the Gospel of Matthew, it contains only Matthew 12:24-26.32-33. The manuscript paleographically had been assigned to the early 4th century.

Description 

The manuscript is written in large upright uncial letters.

The Greek text of this codex probably is a mixture of text-types. Aland placed it in Category III.

In Matthew 12:25 it has textual variant ιδων δε (instead of ειδως δε) in agreement with Codex Bezae, corrector b of the Codex Sinaiticus, 892*, the Latin text of Codex Bezae (itd), k, c, s, copbo. In 12:32 it lacks words αυτω ουτε.

It is currently housed at the Muhlenberg College (Theol. Pap. 3) in Allentown (Pennsylvania).

See also
 List of New Testament papyri
 Matthew 12

References

Further reading

External links 

 Rodney J. Decker, Description and Pictures of Oxyrhyncus Papyri 1227 (= P21) and 1077
 Trexler Library, 1227. St. Matthew's gospel, xii. Muhlenberg College.

New Testament papyri
3rd-century biblical manuscripts
Early Greek manuscripts of the New Testament
Gospel of Matthew papyri